Su Junfeng (born 24 November 1989) is a Chinese footballer who plays as a forward for China League Two side Tai'an Tiankuang.

Career

Su started his career with Chinese fourth division side Baoding Rongda, helping them achieve promotion to the Chinese second division within 3 seasons.

In 2017, he signed for Northern Tigers in the Australian third division.

Before the 2018 season, Su signed for Chinese third division club Yinchuan Helanshan.

References

External links
 
 

Chinese footballers
Expatriate soccer players in Australia
Chinese expatriate sportspeople in Australia
Chinese expatriate footballers
China League One players
1989 births
Association football forwards
Living people